Mendota Township is located in LaSalle County, Illinois, United States.  As of the 2010 census, its population was 7,534 and it contained 3,111 housing units. Mendota Township was formed from Meriden Township in February, 1856.

Geography

Demographics

References

External links
US Census
City-data.com
Illinois State Archives

Townships in LaSalle County, Illinois
Populated places established in 1856
Townships in Illinois
1856 establishments in Illinois